In medicine, a deficiency is a lack or shortage of a functional entity, by less than normal or necessary supply or function.

Nutrients

Malnutrition can cause various effects by deficiency of one or more nutrients. For example, vitamin A deficiency causes symptoms such as xerophthalmia (dry eyes) and night blindness.

Endogenously produced proteins
Deficiencies of endogenously produced proteins such as enzymes are the underlying mechanisms of almost all genetic disorders, for example the inborn errors of metabolism.

See also
Complement deficiency

References

Medical terminology
Human diseases and disorders